The 1972 Winter Olympics, officially the  and commonly known as Sapporo 1972, was a winter multi-sport event held from February 3 to 13, 1972, in Sapporo, Japan. It was the first Winter Olympic Games to take place outside Europe and North America.

Host city selection

Sapporo first won the rights to host the 1940 Winter Olympics, but Japan resigned as the Games' host after its 1937 invasion of China. The 1940 Games were later cancelled. All the cities awarded Games that were cancelled due to war have since hosted the Games (London, Tokyo, Helsinki, Sapporo and Cortina d'Ampezzo).

Sapporo competed with Banff, Lahti, and Salt Lake City. The Games were awarded at the 64th IOC Session in Rome, Italy, on April 26, 1966.

In preparation, the Japanese constructed new largescale facilities at Sapporo and conducted a trial run a full year in advance of the Games. An international sport week was held in February, 1971, to assess the city's preparations as well as "to test its civic mettle and hospitality", and this effort was acclaimed by Olympic observers as "a complete success". The development of new infrastructure proved to be a huge boon for the Sapporo economy: by the time of the Games, the national government had invested some US$500 million in upgrades, including a new subway. The Games' organizers themselves turned a healthy profit in part because they arranged a record $8.47 million for broadcast rights.

Highlights

Emperor Shōwa became the third dignitary to open the Olympic Games twice (first time in summer 1964), after Adolf Hitler had done in winter and summer 1936, then Giovanni Gronchi in winter 1956 and summer 1960.
Prior to these games, Japan had never won a gold medal, and had won only one medal (silver by Chiharu Igaya in 1956) overall, in the Winter Olympics. The host country's fans in Sapporo were boosted when three Japanese athletes, led by Yukio Kasaya, swept the ski jumping 70 m (current K-90 normal hill) event for gold (Kasaya), silver (Akitsugu Konno), and bronze (Seiji Aochi); those would also be the only medals Japan would earn in these Olympics.
Galina Kulakova of the USSR won all three cross-country skiing events for women.
Dutch skater Ard Schenk won three gold medals in speed skating.
In Women's Alpine Skiing, American Barbara Cochran, one of three siblings on the U.S. Ski Team, became the first U.S. woman since Andrea Mead Lawrence to win a gold medal in skiing when she took first place in the slalom.
In Alpine skiing, virtual unknown Swiss Marie-Thérès Nadig won both the downhill and the giant slalom events.
Magnar Solberg from Norway was the first repeat winner in the individual 20 km biathlon event, having first won in Grenoble.
Spain scored its first Winter gold medal courtesy of slalom skier Francisco Fernández Ochoa. Poland did the same with Wojciech Fortuna winning large hill ski jumping competition. 
American female speedskaters Anne Henning and Dianne Holum made the United States' best showing in the Winter Games, winning two gold, a silver, and a bronze.
Three days before the Games, controversy over amateur status arose when IOC president Avery Brundage threatened to disqualify 40 alpine skiers who received endorsement and other deals. Austrian skier Karl Schranz, who received over $50,000 per year from ski manufacturers, was banned as an example. Meanwhile, Canada refused to send an ice hockey team, maintaining that professional ice hockey players from Communist nations were allowed to compete with no restrictions.
On a historical note, these Games are the last where a skier won the gold medal using all-wooden skis. Since this time, top-level cross-country skiers use skis made mostly of fibreglass synthetics.
In female Figure skating event, American skater Janet Lynn won not only a bronze medal, but also tremendous popularity among Japanese audiences because of her artistic free program, as to make appearance on the cover of "Olympic Winter Games, Sapporo 1972" photo books published in Japan, and even on Japanese TV commercials later.
Luge had its only tie in the history of the Winter Olympics in the men's doubles event.

Venues 

City venues
Makomanai Park
Makomanai Speed Skating Rink1 – opening ceremonies, speed skating
Makomanai Ice Arena1 – ice hockey, figure skating, closing ceremonies
Olympic village1
Press center1
Makomanai Cross-Country Events Site1 – cross-country skiing, Nordic combined (cross-country skiing)
Makomanai Biathlon Site1 – biathlon
Mikaho Indoor Skating Rink1 – figure skating
Tsukisamu Indoor Skating Rink1 – ice hockey
Mountain venues
Mt. Teine Alpine Skiing courses1 – alpine skiing (slalom, giant slalom)
Mt. Teine Bobsleigh Course – bobsleigh
Mt. Teine Luge Course – luge
Okurayama Jump Hill2 – ski jumping (large hill)
Miyanomori Jump Hill1 – Nordic combined (ski jumping), ski jumping (normal hill)
Mount Eniwa Downhill Course1 – alpine skiing (downhill)

1 New facilities constructed in preparation for the Olympic Games. 2 Existing facilities modified or refurbished in preparation for the Olympic Games.

Sports 
There were 35 events contested in 6 sports (10 disciplines).

Participating nations
35 nations participated in the 1972 Winter Olympics. The Republic of China (commonly known as Taiwan) and the Philippines participated in their first Winter Olympic Games.

Number of athletes by National Olympic Committees

<noinclude>

Medal count 

These are the top eleven nations that won medals at these Games. The host nation Japan finished 11th.

Podium sweeps

See also

Notes

External links

Sapporo 72  – Official report, digitized copy online
The program of the 1972 Sapporo Winter Olympics

 
Sports competitions in Sapporo
Winter Olympics, 1972
Winter Olympics by year
Winter Olympics
Winter Olympics
Winter Olympics
Winter sports competitions in Japan
Winter Olympics, 1972